Hankins is a surname. Notable people with the surname include:

Abraham P. Hankins (1900–1963), American painter
Antthony Mark Hankins (born 1968), American fashion designer
Catherine Hankins (born 1949), Canadian epidemiologist
Cecil Hankins (1922–2002), American basketball and football player
Cornelius Hankins (1863–1946), American painter
Dena Hankins (born 1975), American author
Dennis B. Hankins (born 1959), American diplomat and ambassador
Don Hankins (1902–1963), American baseball player
Ethan Hankins (born 2000), American baseball player
Frank H. Hankins (1877–1970), American sociologist and anthropologist
Freeman Hankins (1917–1988), American politician
George Hankins (born 1997), English cricketer
Harold Hankins (1930–2009), British electrical engineer
Harry Hankins (born 1999), English cricketer
James Hankins (born 1955), American historian
Jay Hankins (1935–2020), American baseball player
Johnathan Hankins (born 1992), American football player
Lethia Sherman Hankins (1934–2014), American activist and civic leader
Rebecca Hankins, American academic
Shirley Hankins (born 1931), American politician
Steve Hankins (born 1952), English rugby league footballer of the 1980s
Terry Hankins (1974–2009), American serial killer
Thomas L. Hankins (born 1933), American science historian
Travis Hankins, American politician
Zach Hankins (born 1996), American basketball player

See also
Hankin, a surname
Surnames from given names